Park Dong-pil (born 14 August 1968) is a South Korean backstroke swimmer. He competed in three events at the 1988 Summer Olympics.

References

External links
 

1968 births
Living people
South Korean male backstroke swimmers
Olympic swimmers of South Korea
Swimmers at the 1988 Summer Olympics
Place of birth missing (living people)